Lee Mi-sun (born 19 February 1979 in Gwangju, South Korea) is a Korean former basketball player who competed in the 2000 Summer Olympics, in the 2004 Summer Olympics, and in the 2008 Summer Olympics.

References

1979 births
Living people
Asian Games medalists in basketball
Basketball players at the 2000 Summer Olympics
Basketball players at the 2004 Summer Olympics
Basketball players at the 2008 Summer Olympics
Basketball players at the 2002 Asian Games
Basketball players at the 2010 Asian Games
Basketball players at the 2014 Asian Games
Olympic basketball players of South Korea
South Korean women's basketball players
Asian Games gold medalists for South Korea
Asian Games silver medalists for South Korea

Medalists at the 2002 Asian Games
Medalists at the 2010 Asian Games
Medalists at the 2014 Asian Games